Conrad Alfred Benson (April 25, 1889 – March 1, 1969) was an Icelandic-Canadian professional ice hockey player. He played for the Portland Rosebuds of the Pacific Coast Hockey Association from 1914 to 1915.

During the 1913–14 season Benson played with the Phoenix team in the Boundary League in British Columbia. He had also previously played hockey in Winnipeg.

He was the older brother of ice hockey player Robert Benson.

References

External links
Connie Benson at JustSportsStats
Statistics

1889 births
1969 deaths
Ice hockey people from Saskatchewan
Portland Rosebuds players
Saskatoon Sheiks players
Canadian ice hockey defencemen
Canadian people of Icelandic descent